Nikita Serikovich Stalnov (born 14 September 1991) is a Kazakhstani former cyclist, who last rode for UCI WorldTeam . He was named in the startlist for the 2017 and 2018 Vuelta a España. Stalnov retired from competition at the end of the 2021 season.

Major results

2010
 2nd Flèche Ardennaise
 9th Overall Vuelta Independencia Nacional
1st Stage 3
2012
 3rd Race Horizon Park
 4th Overall La Tropicale Amissa Bongo
1st Stage 2
 4th Ruota d'Oro
 9th Overall Tour Alsace
2015
 6th Tour of Almaty
 6th Overall Tour of Bulgaria
 7th Overall East Bohemia Tour
2016
 3rd Overall Tour of Turkey
 3rd Overall Tour d'Azerbaïdjan
 3rd Overall Tour of Ukraine
2018
 2nd Road race, National Road Championships
2020
 5th Overall Vuelta a Murcia

Grand Tour general classification results timeline

References

External links

1991 births
Living people
Kazakhstani male cyclists
Sportspeople from Astana
20th-century Kazakhstani people
21st-century Kazakhstani people